Dichagyris variabilis, the yellow dart, is a species of cutworm or dart moth in the family Noctuidae.

The MONA or Hodges number for Dichagyris variabilis is 10889.

References

Further reading

 
 
 

variabilis
Articles created by Qbugbot
Moths described in 1874